This is a list of nocturnal animals and groups of animals. Birds are listed separately in the List of nocturnal birds.

Known nocturnal animals

 Aardvark
 African elephant (possibly crepuscular)
 Aye-aye
 Badger
 Bandicoot
 Bat
 Bat-eared fox
 Beaver
 Bilby
 Binturong
 Black rhinoceros
 Black rat
 Black-footed cat
 Brown rat
 Galago (bushbaby)
 Bush rat
 Capybara (some are crepuscular)
 Caracal
 Cat (can be awake at any time of day or night but are mostly crepuscular)
 Catfish
 Cheetah
 Chinchilla
 Civet
 Cockroach
 Cougar
 Coyote
 Cricket
Cacomistle
 Cyprus spiny mouse
 Dingo
 Dog (can be awake at any time of day or night)
 Dwarf crocodile
 Eastern woolly lemur
 Firefly
 Flying squirrel
 Gerbil (some are diurnal or crepuscular)
 Gray wolf
 Great grey slug
 Great white shark (Possibly crepuscular)
 Hamster
 Hedgehog
 Hermit crab
 Hippopotamus
 Honey badger
 Hyena
 Hoffmann's two-toed sloth
 Iranian jerboa
 Jaguar (bordering on crepuscular)
 Kangaroo (most, a few are crepuscular)
 Koala (mostly nocturnal)
 Kinkajou
 Kit fox (mostly)
 Leopard
 Leopard Gecko
 Lion (bordering on crepuscular)
 Margay
 Mink (bordering on crepuscular)
 Mole
 Mouse
 Nightingale
 Nightjar
 Nine-banded armadillo
 Octodon (except the diurnal degus species)
 Oncilla
 Ocelot
 Opossum
 Orca (For a few reasons)
 Otter
 Owl
 Owl monkey
 Panamanian night monkey
 Pangolin
 Platypus
 Paradoxical frog
 Polar bear
 Porcupine
 Possum
 Puma
 Python regius
 Quoll
 Rabbit rat
 Raccoon
 Red-eyed tree frog
 Red fox
 Ringtail
 Scorpion
 Skunk
 Slender loris
 Slow loris
 Spectacled bear
 Sportive lemur
 Sugar glider
 Tapeti
 Tarantula
 Tarsier
 Tasmanian devil
 Tiger (most species)
 Onychophora
 Western woolly lemur
 Whip-poor-will
 White-faced storm petrel (when caring for young)
 White-tailed deer (bordering on crepuscular)
 Wombat

Extinct nocturnal animals
 Ctenochasma
 Palaeochiropteryx
 Panthera onca augusta (Pleistocene North American jaguar)
 Panthera onca mesembrina (Pleistocene South American jaguar)
 Rhamphorhynchus
 Shuvuuia
 Thylacinus cynocephalus (Thylacine)
 Troodon
 Tyto pollens
 Velociraptor

See also
 Crepuscular, a classification of animals that are active primarily during twilight, making them similar to nocturnal animals.
 Diurnality, plant or animal behavior characterized by activity during the day and sleeping at night.
 Cathemeral, a classification of organisms with sporadic and random intervals of activity during the day or night.
 Matutinal, a classification of organisms that are only or primarily active in the pre-dawn hours or early night.
 Vespertine, a classification of organisms that are only or primarily active in the evening.
 Circadian rhythm
 Chronotype

References

External links
The Susceptibility of Nocturnal Animals to Ultra-violet Radiation
BBC Nature Wildlife, Nocturnal

Lists of animals
Animals by adaptation